Zolfabad may refer to:
 Zolfabad, Rey